Super Mother 2 is an Armenian adventure comedy film written by Robert Martirosyan and Arman Marutyan and directed by Arman Marutyan and Vahagn Khachatryan.  The film is a sequel to the 2015 film Super Mother and mostly has the same cast. The film was completed in 2017 and was available in Armenian theaters from October 5, 2017. In the Republic of Artsakh, the film premiered on October 8. The official trailer was uploaded by Kargin Studio to YouTube on September 16, 2017. Marutyan has also mentioned that the second movie is approximately twice more expensive than the first one.

Plot
Karen and Sona continue their life together, however, Karen does not pay an attention to his family. Sona's company's accounter steals a lot of money and manages to hide them. Karen becomes Karine one more time, tries everything to get back the money and reconcile with his wife. Menua, despite being the main villain of the first movie, helps Karen to get back the money.

Cast
 Hayk Marutyan as Karen and Karine Barseghyan
 Garik Papoyan as Menua and Monika 
 Ani Khachikyan as Sona
 Levon Haroutyunyan as Shef
 Arman Martirosyan as Tigran
 Andranik Harutyunyan as Zoub
 Rafayel Yeranosyan as Zhme
 Arman Navasardyan as Ashot
 Eva Khachatryan as Syuzi
 Lili Elbakyan as Lilitik
 Arsine Navasardyan as Coghik
 Sepuh Apikyan as Manvel
 Hrach Muradyan as Vasak

References

External links
 
 Official Facebook page

Armenian comedy films
2010s adventure comedy films
Films shot in Armenia
Hayk Marutyan films